Rosemary Thomson is a Canadian conductor and chorus master. As of 2018, she is the Music Director of the Okanagan Symphony Orchestra, chorus master of the Calgary Philharmonic, and Assistant Conductor for the Canadian Opera Company.

Early life and education
Thomson was born in St. Catharines, Ontario. She received a Bachelor of Music degree (piano) from the University of Toronto and is also a graduate of their Advanced Graduate Conducting Program.

Career
From 1994 to 1996 Thomson was the conductor for the Dundas Valley Orchestra in Hamilton, Ontario. In 1997 and 1998 she worked as a resident conductor for the Winnipeg Symphony Orchestra.

Thomson was hired as resident conductor of the Calgary Philharmonic orchestra for three seasons, beginning in 2001. In 2006 she was a guest conductor for the Toronto Symphony Youth Orchestra.

She became conductor of the Okanagan Symphony orchestra in the 2007-08 season.

In 2008 Thomson was a guest conductor with the Vancouver Symphony Orchestra. In 2011 she was chorus master of the Calgary Philharmonic and assistant conductor for the Canadian Opera Company.

In 2015 she conducted the Vancouver Opera Orchestra for the UBC Opera Ensemble's production of Manon.

In 2018 Thomson conducted the orchestra for Opera Neuvo's farcical production The ARctic Flute in Edmonton.

Awards
London Music Foundation Rosie Robinow Prize for promising pianist (1986)
Sir Ernest MacMillan Memorial Foundation Award for Orchestral Conductors (1998)

References

External links
Calgary Philharmonic. Rosemary Thomson, Chorusmaster

Living people
21st-century Canadian conductors (music)
Year of birth missing (living people)
21st-century Canadian women musicians